WQZY (95.9 FM) is a radio station broadcasting a country music format. Licensed to Dublin, Georgia, United States. The station is currently owned by State Broadcasting Corporation and features programming from CNN Radio.

References

External links

QZY
Radio stations established in 1992